Rashid Magomedovich Kurbanov (born 16 February 1987 in Dagestan) is an Uzbekistani - Dagestani and Russian freestyle wrestler that competed at the 2013 World Wrestling Championships at 74 kg. He won bronze medal.

In 2020, he competed in the men's 79 kg event at the 2020 Individual Wrestling World Cup held in Belgrade, Serbia.

References 

 Profile

Living people
Wrestlers at the 2010 Asian Games
Wrestlers at the 2014 Asian Games
Asian Games medalists in wrestling
World Wrestling Championships medalists
Uzbekistani male sport wrestlers
Asian Games gold medalists for Uzbekistan
1987 births

Medalists at the 2014 Asian Games
Wrestlers at the 2018 Asian Games
Asian Wrestling Championships medalists
20th-century Uzbekistani people
21st-century Uzbekistani people